Beragee Bomb is a 2013 Indian Meitei language comedy film directed by O. Gautam and written by Laishram Santosh. It stars Gurumayum Bonny, Leishangthem Tonthoi, Loya, Suraj Sharma Laimayum and Edwin Soibam. The movie was released on 31 August 2013 at MFDC with a Red Carpet Event, hosted by WOL Media for the first time in Manipuri cinema. The official trailer of the film was released by WOL Media on 18 August 2013.

A sequel to the film titled Moreh Maru was produced by RT Motion Pictures and released in 2016.

Synopsis
Mani and Thoibi decides to elope one day. Manibabu, who constantly threatens Thoibi, learns about it and starts chasing them. As a series of unforeseen events unfolded, the eloping lovebirds and Mani's friends Mangal and Ahenba find themselves hooked around a bomb discovered in a scooter they took from a college parking area. Finally, Mani, Mangal and Ahenba end up eloping with their girlfriends on the same day.

Cast
 Gurumayum Bonny as Manibabu
 Leishangthem Tonthoi as Thoibi
 Edwin Soibam as Mani
 Loya (Mukabala) as Mangal
 Suraj Sharma Laimayum as Ahenba
 Idhou as Thoibi's Father
 R.K. Hemabati as Thoibi's Mother
 Ratan Lai as Police
 Surjit Saikhom as Mechanic

Accolades
The film bagged two awards at the 3rd SSS MANIFA 2014.

Soundtrack
Chongtham Vivek (Ali) composed the soundtrack for the film and Ali and Jack wrote the lyrics. The song is titled Leirangna Keidouruni Nanggi Maithongduda. The choreograph for the song is done by Babycha Salam.

See also 
 List of Meitei-language films

References

External links
 

2010s Meitei-language films
Indian comedy films
2013 films
2013 comedy films